The Feldkirch–Buchs railway is a  electrified single track railway line that links Austria and Switzerland passing through Liechtenstein. Owned by the Austrian Federal Railways (ÖBB), it is the only railway line in Liechtenstein.

History
The line opened in 1872, during the opening period of the Vorarlberg Railway, and was electrified in 1926. It is served by some pairs of regional trains and buses and by some international trains (EuroCity, InterCity, and Railjets) that are non-stop between Feldkirch and Buchs.

In June 2008 the Canton of St. Gallen, the Federal State of Vorarlberg, and the Principality of Liechtenstein signed an agreement for a project to upgrade the line (and the surrounding ones) and to increase the rail traffic. The project, named  was approved by Liechtenstein and Austria in a Letter of Intent signed in April 2020 and under that plan, it was to be fully realised by 2027 and will cost an estimated €187 million. That plan was however rejected by 62.3% of Liechtenstein voters in a referendum on 30 August 2020.

Stations

Gallery

Notes and references

External links
 S-Bahn FL.A.CH project

Railway lines in Austria
Rail transport in Liechtenstein
Railway lines in Switzerland
Railway lines opened in 1872
International railway lines
Feldkirch, Vorarlberg
Transport in the canton of St. Gallen